The 2012 Phillip Island 6 Hour was an endurance race for modified production touring cars, staged at the Phillip Island Grand Prix Circuit in Victoria, Australia on 29 April 2012.  The race was Round 2 of the 2012 Australian Manufacturers' Championship, Round 2 of the 2012 Australian Production Car Championship, Round 1 of the 2012 Australian Endurance Championship and Round 1 of the 2012 Australian Production Car Endurance Championship. It was the second annual Phillip Island 6 Hour race to be held at the Victorian circuit.

Classes
Cars competed in the following classes:
 Class A – Extreme Performance
 Class B – High Performance
 Class C – Performance Touring
 Class D – Production Touring
 Class E – Compact Touring
 Class I – MINI Cup

Results

Drivers whose names are shown in brackets in the above table did not drive the car during the actual race.

References

External links
 Image gallery at www.narraphotography.com.au

Phillip Island 6 Hour
Motorsport at Phillip Island
April 2012 sports events in Australia